For the musician, see Julius Rietz.

Rietz is a municipality in the Imst district, Austria, and is located 23 km east of Imst and 4 km west of Telfs on the southern shore of the Inn River. It is a peculiarity that the village has no sun during winter time because of the height of the Stubai Alps. The village is mentioned in documents dating from the year 1264 and has been a community since the year 1325. The main source of income is tourism.

Population

References

External links

Cities and towns in Imst District